Ning Zhenyun (born June 2, 1982 in Qingdao, Shandong) is a female Chinese football (soccer) player who competed at the 2004 Summer Olympics.

In 2004, she was a squad member of the Chinese team which finished ninth in the women's tournament.

External links
profile

1982 births
Living people
Chinese women's footballers
Footballers at the 2004 Summer Olympics
Olympic footballers of China
Footballers from Qingdao
Women's association footballers not categorized by position